Robert Gregson may refer to:

Robert Gregson (filmmaker), American filmmaker
Bob Gregson (1778–1824), British bare-knuckle fighter